Cristina R. Pucelli (born June 11, 1969) is an American voice actress. She is best known for her voices in animated series and video games.

Early life and education
Pucelli was born on June 11, 1969, in Orange County, California, to a family of second-generation Italian immigrants. She studied voice-over under the guidance of Ginny McSwain, Bob Bergen, Louise Chamis and Mary Lynn Wissner.

Career
Her most-known role was that of Joe's girlfriend, Silvia, in the Viewtiful Joe games. She then went on to do voice work in Xenosaga Episode II and Xenosaga Episode III as MOMO and in Psychonauts, as Elton Fir. She also voiced Patrick on the television series Allen Gregory. In video games, she voiced Luka in Lost Planet: Extreme Condition, Sunny in Metal Gear Solid 4: Guns of the Patriots and Metal Gear Rising: Revengeance. She also voices Luan Loud on Nickelodeon's television series The Loud House. In radio, she voices the character of Emily Jones in the Adventures in Odyssey program.

Filmography

Film

Television

Video games

References

External links
 
 
 

1969 births
21st-century American actresses
Living people
Actresses from Orange County, California
American people of Italian descent
American radio actresses
American video game actresses
American voice actresses